OSIsoft, LLC is        a manufacturer of application software for real-time data management, called the PI System. Founded in 1980, OSIsoft was privately held and headquartered in San Leandro, California. In August 2020, it was announced that the UK-based production company AVEVA agreed to buy OSIsoft in a deal worth $5 billion; the purchase was subsequently completed on 19 March 2021 for a final consideration of £3,831.4 million.

Products
OSIsoft develops and supports software used to capture, process, analyze, and store any form of real-time data. OSIsoft's target markets include oil and gas; chemicals and petrochemicals; materials, mines, metals, and metallurgy; power and utilities; pulp and paper; pharmaceuticals, food, and life sciences; critical facilities, data centers and IT; and federal.

The PI System is a suite of software products that are used for data collection, historicizing, finding, analyzing, delivering, and visualizing. It is marketed as an enterprise infrastructure for management of real-time data and events. The term PI System is often used to refer to the PI Server but the two are not the same. The PI System refers to all OSIsoft software products whereas the PI Server is the core product of the PI System.

Data can be automatically collected from many sources (control systems, lab equipment, calculations, manual entry or custom software). Most information is gathered using one of the many OSIsoft and third-party PI Interfaces. Users can then access this information using a common set of tools (such as Microsoft Excel, web browser, or PI ProcessBook) and look for correlations. Some examples include:
 Analyzing seasonal trends
 Determining if utilities are meeting the demands of production
 Comparing the performance of different lots of raw material
 Determining when maintenance is required on equipment
 Optimizing the utilization or performance of a production line

On January 5, 2011, OSIsoft announced a $135 million minority investment by Technology Crossover Ventures and Kleiner Perkins Caufield & Byers .

Lit San Leandro, a business associated with OSIsoft, has built a fiber-optic network in the city of San Leandro, linking high tech and other businesses. They have also proposed providing a high-speed fiber-optic network for the industrial corridor in nearby Hayward.

PI Data Archive
The PI Data Archive collects, stores, and organizes data from data sources, providing an information infrastructure. The PI Server also includes tools for analytics, alerts, and auditing. The PI Server may be connected to almost any existing automation, lab, or information system. Operators, engineers, managers, and other plant personnel can use client applications to connect to the PI Server to view data stored in the PI Server or in external data archive systems.

PI Asset Framework (AF)
PI AF allows the definition of consistent representations of organizational assets and/or equipment and uses these representations in analyses that yield critical and actionable information.

PI ProcessBook
PI ProcessBook is a software tool used to display data in a graphical manner. A display can be created with single values, trends, x-y plots and other items, and populated with data from the PI or AF Server. It is mainly used by end-users as a comparison or monitoring tool. Additional functionality can be applied to ProcessBook through the use of custom scripts developed with an embedded version of Visual Basic for Applications. ProcessBook is currently retired in favour of PI Vision

PI DataLink
Add-in to Excel for tabular data analysis. Provides an end-user the ability to import data from the PI or AF Server for manipulation, comparison, or report generating. Data can be imported in a variety of ways including archived, calculated, and filtered data.

PI Web API
The PI Web API is a RESTful interface to the PI system. It gives client applications read and write access to their PI Asset Framework and PI Data Archive over HTTPS.

PI Vision
A simple web-based tool for quick ad hoc displays. PI Vision is a thin client tool and can be used anywhere an Internet connection is available, as opposed to the other end-user tools that are considered fat client and require a local installation. Prior to March 2017, PI Vision was called PI Coresight.

PI Connectors and PI Interfaces 
PI Connectors and PI Interfaces are designed to gather data from a data source, convert to a PI readable format, and send to the PI Data Archive to be stored. Unlike Interfaces, Connectors are able to collect and send metadata to the PI Asset Framework in addition to real-time data.  The most common PI Interfaces are OPC, PItoPI, Modbus, RDBMS, and Universal File Loader (UFL).

PI Integrators 
PI Integrators is a line of web-based applications that prepare and send time-series data to third-party analytics platforms.  The PI Integrator cleanses, augments, shapes, and transmits data from PI into common business intelligence and data warehouse tools, such as Power BI, Tableau, Hadoop, Microsoft Azure, and Amazon Web Services.  Current products include the PI Integrator for Esri ArcGIS, PI Integrator for Business Analytics, and PI Integrator for SAP HANA.

References

External links

Yahoo Biz
BNET
Managing Automation
PI Web API Online Documentation
Online Documentation
Learning Portal

Time series software
Data analysis software
Data visualization software
MES software
Software companies established in 1980
Software companies based in the San Francisco Bay Area
Companies based in San Leandro, California
1980 establishments in California
Defunct software companies of the United States
2021 mergers and acquisitions